KEFE-LP is a low-power broadcast radio station licensed to Lakeville, Minnesota.

References

External links

Low-power FM radio stations in Minnesota
Radio stations established in 2015
2015 establishments in Minnesota
Christian radio stations in Minnesota